Dennis Schmidt (born April 18, 1988) is a German footballer who plays for SSV Dhünn.

External links
 Player profile at SV Wehen Wiesbaden
 
 

1988 births
Living people
German footballers
Bayer 04 Leverkusen II players
SV Wehen Wiesbaden players
VfL Osnabrück players
FC Viktoria Köln players
Sportfreunde Lotte players
SV Darmstadt 98 players
Wuppertaler SV players
Germany under-21 international footballers
Germany youth international footballers
2. Bundesliga players
3. Liga players
Association football forwards